The 2010 Medibank International Sydney was a tennis tournament played on outdoor hard courts. It was the 118th edition of the event known that year as the Medibank International Sydney, and was part of the ATP World Tour 250 series of the 2010 ATP World Tour, and of the WTA Premier tournaments of the 2010 WTA Tour. Both the men's and the women's events took place at the NSW Tennis Centre in Sydney, Australia, from 10 through 16 January 2010.

Coverage of the event was on Channel Seven, with live coverage of the day sessions and delayed coverage of the night sessions.

WTA entrants

Seeds

 As of 4 January 2010

Other entrants
The following players received wildcards into the singles main draw:
  Casey Dellacqua
  Justine Henin (withdrew due to left gluteal strain)

The following players received entry into the singles main draw through qualifying:
  Jill Craybas
  Kimiko Date-Krumm
  Vera Dushevina
  Anna-Lena Grönefeld
  Varvara Lepchenko
  Ágnes Szávay

The following players received entry into the singles main draw through the virtue of being a lucky loser:
  Timea Bacsinszky

ATP entrants

Seeds

Other entrants
The following players received wildcards into the singles main draw:
  Carsten Ball
  Nick Lindahl
  Peter Luczak

The following players received entry into the singles main draw through qualifying:
  Juan Ignacio Chela
  Frederico Gil
  Marinko Matosevic
  Leonardo Mayer

The following players received the lucky loser spot:
  Taylor Dent
  Daniel Gimeno Traver

Finals

Men's singles

 Marcos Baghdatis defeated  Richard Gasquet, 6–4, 7–6(7–2)
It was Baghdatis' first title of the year and fourth of his career.

Women's singles

 Elena Dementieva defeated  Serena Williams, 6–3, 6–2
 It was Dementieva's first title of the year, 15th of her career, and her second consecutive title at the event.

Men's doubles

 Daniel Nestor /  Nenad Zimonjić defeated  Ross Hutchins /  Jordan Kerr, 6–3, 7–6(7–5).

Women's doubles

 Cara Black /  Liezel Huber defeated  Tathiana Garbin /  Nadia Petrova, 6–1, 3–6, [10–3]

External links
Official website

 
Medibank International Sydney, 2010